Liatroim Fontenoys is a Gaelic Athletic Association Club in County Down, Northern Ireland. The club promotes hurling, Gaelic football, and camogie.

History
Liatroim Fontenoys, a small rural club in County Down, founded in the village with the same name (Leitrim), was founded in February 1888 by and is the first GAA club established in that county. The McAleenan brothers from nearby Ballymaginaghy were working in Dublin during 1887. While there, they met Maurice Davin and Michael Cusack, early pioneers of the Gaelic Athletic Association (GAA). Around this time J.L. Savage, a native of nearby Backaderry, learned about Gaelic games. In 1888, Savage and the McAleenans founded Liatroim Fontenoys GAC, named for the Battle of Fontenoy (1745) in which an Irish Brigade helped the French to a victory over the British (part of the War of the Austrian Succession). In 1902, John Henry King of Newcastle helped revive the GAA after a period of decline. By 1905 they were firmly re-established when a new generation of footballers won their first County Championship and were undefeated in the league under captain Mick Keown. In 1921, the Fontenoys became the only Down club to win Senior County Championships in both hurling and football; a feat still unmatched. 

During the years that followed the club competed in both codes without any major success. In 1947, P.F. McCartan was selected as Ulster Hurling Goal-keeper, while in football, P.J McElroy was selected as full back for Ulster in 1955. In 1968 Colm McAlarney became the first Railway Cup medallist when Ulster defeated Leinster on St. Patrick's Day. Later that year, on 22 September, Colm McAlarney starred at mid-field and Willie Doyle at centre halfback for Down who defeated Kerry in Croke Park. In September 1999, Doyle's son, Liam, led the Down Minors to victory in the All Ireland Football Championship. 

During the 1950s a camogie team was established by the parish priest, Father McCartan, but within a few years time numbers had fallen and so the game was phased out. By 1972 interest in camogie was revived and training sessions arranged. Within two years, two players - Sheila McCartan and Bernie Malone - had collected All-Ireland Minor Championships medals with Down, and in 1976 Bernie Brown starred for Down to collect a Junior Championship All-Ireland medal. Within five years from its formation the Fontenoy camogs had advanced to senior status and in 1977 collected the County League and Championship double. In 1984 Liatroim's under 14 camogs won the Division 3 title Feile nGael All-Ireland in Wexford captained by Monica McCartan. Later that year in September, Liatroim senior camogie team won their first Ulster Club Championship title captained by Nuala McCartan. 

In 1991 Down won the All-Ireland Junior Championship in camogie with nine Liatroim players on the panel. In 1995 the senior camogie team collected their second Ulster Championship title when they outplayed Lavey. Their captain was Bernie Kelly, and the following year they retained that title by defeating Dunloy. On this occasion their captain was Maureen O’Higgins. Later that year Máirín McAleenan, who became the first Down camogie player to be honoured by the Ulster Writers who selected her Player of the Year.  The following year, a camogie sevens team won the All-Ireland junior title on 6 September in Kilmacud.  In 1998 the senior team regained the Ulster Club Championship by defeating Dunloy. Majella Murray was the captain. Máirín McAleenan scored three goals, 11 points and in November was selected by the Ulster Writers as Player of the year for the second time. Down won the All-Ireland league title in May 1998 and added the All-Ireland Intermediate Championship Title in September. The senior camogie team retained their Ulster Club Championship Title in  1999, captained by Nuala Magee they defeated Crosserlough, and later that year Liatriom were honoured to have two players Nuala Magee and Mairin McAleenan selected for Rest of Ireland team, who defeated All-Ireland Senior Champions Tipperary on 14 November in Croke Park. In 2001 the senior camogie team collected their twelfth successive Championship and twentieth successive Senior League title.

Hurling
There have been mixed fortunes at Club level for the Fontenoy Hurlers, winning the Down Intermediate championship in 1998, and again in 2001, captained on both occasions by John Brown. In October 2006, Declan Burns led the club to another Intermediate title at the expense of Ballycran IIs. Liatroim Fontenoys enjoyed their best day on the Hurling front for some years when, on 23 October 2006, they defeated Armagh in the Ulster Intermediate Club hurling Semi-final in Casement Park. Their opponents in the Ulster final on 5 November at St Tiernach's Park, Clones, were Antrim's representatives, Gort na Móna. 

On the 3rd of December 2022 Leitrim became the first club in County Down to win the Ulster intermediate hurling championship, beating Middletown 2-20 to 0-20.

Camogie
The Liatroim Camógs have been represented on Down teams at all levels over many years. In 2004 Cumann Camógaíochta na nGael celebrated its Centenary, and Liatroim Fontenoys player was subsequently selected as Centenary Ambassador for Down and Ulster. Later that same year, down reached the All-Ireland Junior championship final with five Fontenoys on the panel. Cork defeated Down by five points. 

Liatroim were aiming for Club success, and when they defeated Kilnamona of Clare in the All-Ireland Junior Club semi-final in October 2004, the scene was set for a bid for national honours in Parnell Park on 7 November, with Four Roads of Roscommon the opposition. The Fontenoys won comfortably. In 2005 the Senior Camogie girls reached a second All-Ireland Junior Club final, this time Newmarket-on-Fergus providing the opposition. The first half was keenly contested, but Máirín McAleenan showed just why she holds an All-Star, when she took control of the game in the second half, scoring 3 goals and 2 points, to help Liatroim retain the title. Lisa McCrickard proudly raised the Cup aloft, while McAleenan was selected Player of the Match on that day in Cloughjordan, County Tipperary. Three other Fontenoys were busy picking up individual awards of their own when Gráinne O Higgins, an All-Ireland Féile na nGael Skills Winner in 2002, Karen McMullan and Kelly O'Higgins were selected on the Ulster Colleges All-Star team in 2005, with Kelly being recognised for the second time, having received an award the previous year.

See also
Down Senior Club Football Championship
List of Gaelic Athletic Association clubs

References

External links
Liatroim Fontenoys GAA Club website

Gaelic games clubs in County Down
Gaelic football clubs in County Down
Hurling clubs in County Down